is a Japanese traditional game, similar to racket games like badminton but without a net, played with a rectangular wooden paddle called a hagoita and a brightly coloured shuttlecock, called a hane. Often played by girls at the New Year, the game can be played by any gender in two fashions: by one person attempting to keep the shuttlecock aloft as long as possible, or by two people batting it back and forth. Players who fail to hit the shuttlecock get marked on the face with India Ink. Traditionally, the longer the shuttlecock remains in the air, the greater protection from mosquitoes the players will receive during the coming year. Although hanetsuki is not as popular as it used to be, decorative hagoita are commonly sold throughout Japan.

Hagoita often have pictures of kabuki theatre performers or celebrities on them.

At the beginning of the game's development, soapberry nuts were often used as shuttlecocks.

See also
 Battledore and shuttlecock

References

Japanese games